Kathryn Tappen (born April 9, 1981) is an American sportscaster. Tappen works on NBC Sports Group's coverage of the Notre Dame Football, Football Night in America, Golf, as well as the Summer and Winter Olympic Games among others.

Early life and education
Tappen was born in Morristown, New Jersey on April 9, 1981. Growing up, she played youth baseball and basketball on boys' teams because there were no teams for girls where she lived. She also played golf, tennis and ran cross country. In her senior year of high school at Villa Walsh Academy, Tappen focused exclusively on track and eventually received academic and athletic scholarships to attend Rutgers University.

She was a four-time Academic All-American and Big East All Star as a Scarlet Knight.

Career 
After starting in College Sports Television, Tappen joined WJAR in Providence, R.I., where she served as both a weekend anchor and weekday sports reporter. From there she moved to New England Sports Network (NESN), Tappen then joined the NHL Network in 2011 where she hosted NHL Tonight, and subsequently moved to NBC in the summer of 2014.

In 2014, Tappen won the "Woman of Inspiration" award presented by the Boston Chapter of Women in Sports and Events. She has been nominated for two New England Emmy Awards for sports reporting and won an Associated Press award in 2006 for her feature Swim Meet.

Personal life 
Tappen married former NHL defenseman and coach Jay Leach in July 2009. They divorced in 2014.

References

External links
 NBC Sports Group biography

1981 births
Living people
American television reporters and correspondents
Boston Bruins announcers
College football announcers
National Football League announcers
National Hockey League broadcasters
Notre Dame Fighting Irish football announcers
Olympic Games broadcasters
People from Morristown, New Jersey
Rutgers University alumni
Television anchors from Boston
Women sports announcers